Buffelspoort Dam is an arch type dam in the Sterkstroom River, a tributary of the Crocodile River (West), North West Province, South Africa. Its main purpose is for irrigation use and it is owned by the Department of Water Affairs.

It is located on the northern slopes of Magaliesberg mountain range, 27 km southeast of Rustenburg. This dam is a popular fishing spot.

See also
List of reservoirs and dams in South Africa
List of rivers of South Africa
List of mountain ranges of South Africa

References 

Dams in South Africa
Dams completed in 1937
1937 establishments in South Africa